Alfaro may refer to:

People
Alfaro (surname), including a list of people with the name

Places
Alfaro, La Rioja, Spain
Alfaro, Quito, Ecuador
Alfaro Ruiz, former name of Zarcero (canton), Alajuela province, Costa Rica

Other uses
Alfaro (fish), a genus of poeciliid fishes
CD Alfaro, a football club based in Alfaro, La Rioja